Joel Conlon (born 4 May 1994) is a retired English Rugby union player for Saracens in the Aviva Premiership. He played at Flanker and made his professional debut for Exeter Chiefs against London Welsh in the LV Cup on 11 November 2012.

Joel attended Trinity Church of England School and then Heathfield Community School.

A product of the Exeter Chiefs Academy, Joel signed his first professional contract with Exeter on 25 May 2012.

Conlon was called up to the England under 20s squad in January 2013.

On 20 June 2014, Joel scored the winning try in the 2014 IRB Junior World Championship final, as England beat South Africa 21–20.

For the 2016/2017 season, Joel moved to Saracens.

On 8 November 2018 his retirement from rugby was announced due to a neck injury.

References

External links
 Exeter Chiefs Player Profile
 Aviva Premiership Player Profile
 RFU England Profile

Living people
1994 births
Exeter Chiefs players
Sportspeople from Taunton